The Smotrych is a left tributary of the Dniester, flowing through the Podillia upland of western Ukraine. Its length is 168 km (104 mi), and its drainage basin covers 1,800 km2 (694 mi2). The average width of the river is 10–15 meters wide, and at one point exceeds 40 m.

The river is particularly notable for its tall banks, which give it a ravinelike appearance. It is used for water supply, irrigation, and fishing. A small hydroelectric station is situated on it, as well as the city of Kamianets-Podilskyi, the urban-type settlement Smotrych and the town of Horodok （Khmelnytskyi Oblast).

References

Kamianets-Podilskyi
Ramsar sites in Ukraine
Rivers of Khmelnytskyi Oblast